Nikolay Petrovich Tokarev (20 December 1950 in Karaganda, Kazakh SSR) is a Russian businessman and oligarch. He is the president of the Russian pipeline company Transneft.

Early life and KGB
In 1973, Tokarev graduated from Karaganda Polytechnic Institute (KarPI) with a degree in Electrification and Automation of Mining Works.

From 1978, Tokarev studied at the Moscow Higher School of the KGB for two years while Sergei Naryshkin also studied in the French section at the Higher School of the KGB at the same time and Vladimir Putin, who was also at the Higher School of the KGB, lived across the corridor from Naryshkin at the same time.

With a phone number as Major Tokarew in the Stasi phone book listed as the same number as Hptm. Tschemesow, he was a KGB officer in Dresden, East Germany, where he met and allied with KGB officers Vladimir Putin and Sergey Chemezov who were living in Dresden under their KGB boss Lazar Matveev. After Putin arrived at Dresden in 1985, Tokarev, who arrived at Dresden in 1983 two years before Putin, was a senior comrade to Putin and took him in under his wing. They became close friends.

Between 1996 and 1999 Tokarev worked for the state Presidential Property Management Department where Putin's title was deputy chief in 1996 and 1997.

Oil businessman

From 1999 to 2000, before heading Zarubezhneft, he worked at Transneft in the department of the foreign economic block and foreign projects.

Tokarev has been president of Transneft since October 2007 and a member of the company's board of directors since June 2009. From 2000 to 2007, he was president of the Russian oil company Zarubezhneft.

Tokarev has been board of directors of Rosneft since October 2009.

Under an agreement dated 26 May 2015, Tokarev through his TNT and Transneft-SERVIS pays more than a 100 million rubles a month "for rent of premises of non-residential objects" at Putin's palace at Gelendzhik.

Sanctions 
On 28 February 2022, in relation to the 2022 Russian invasion of Ukraine, the European Union blacklisted Tokarev and had all his assets frozen. On 3 March, the United States imposed similar sanctions on Tokarev, his wife and daughter. On 10 March, the British government imposed sanctions which involved freezing Nikolay's assets and a travel ban.

Sanctioned by New Zealand in relation to the 2022 Russian invasion of Ukraine.

Personal
In 2004, his daughter Maya Bolotova, was associated with Promsvyazbank firms Promsvyazavto, Stroyvip, and Industry Import and are controlled by brothers Alexey Ananiev and Dmitry Ananiev. During her time with Promsvyazbank, the bank significantly increased its assets by six fold between 2004 and 2007 and became one of the three systematically important banks in Russia. In 2002, the company Stroyvip, which has the same address as Promsvyazbank, became a shareholder of the former Pravda now known as the largest publishing and printing complex "Press-1". As of January 2017, Bolotova was a former owner of PharmEco and is a partner at Gelendzhik with Sergey Chemezov's son Stanislav Chemezov who owns a 25% stake, Vladimir Chernyshev who was an advisor to Vladimir Yakunin, and Vladimir Maishev who is a co-owner of the Independent Insurance Group in the LLC Gelendzhik Resort Complex - Meridian. Previously, Bolotova had owned MIK Rusinvest LLC, which is a company that was owned by the family of Vladimir Artyakov, who is the first deputy of the Sergey Chemezov led Rostec, and Stanislav Chemezov who formerly held a 48.5% stake. Bolotova and her husband are citizens of Cyprus. In 2007, Tokarev's son in law Andrey Bolotov (born 1973 or 1974) was closely associated with ITERA from 2001 to 2004 and since 2005 has headed the large clients accounts at Vneshtorgbank (VTB). His sister Olga was closely associated with LUKOIL.

External links
 Tokarev's profile and assets on Russian Asset Tracker

References

1950 births
Living people
Russian businesspeople in the oil industry
KGB officers
Russian individuals subject to United Kingdom sanctions
Russian individuals subject to the U.S. Department of the Treasury sanctions
Russian individuals subject to European Union sanctions
Full Cavaliers of the Order "For Merit to the Fatherland"